The Forrest County School District is a public school district with its headquarters in Hattiesburg, Mississippi (USA)

It serves sections of Forrest County, including portions of Hattiesburg, Glendale, and Rawls Springs.

Brooklyn is the largest community in the district.

Schools
Grades 7-12
North Forrest High School
Grades K-6
North Forrest Elementary
Rawls Springs Attendance Center
Earl Travillion Attendance Center
Grades K-8
Dixie Attendance Center
South Forrest Attendance Center

Demographics

2006-07 school year
There were a total of 2,506 students enrolled in the Forrest County School District during the 2006–2007 school year. The gender makeup of the district was 49% female and 51% male. The racial makeup of the district was 41.30% African American, 57.42% White, 0.84% Hispanic, 0.36% Asian, and 0.08% Native American. 56.5% of the district's students were eligible to receive free lunch.

Previous school years

Accountability statistics

See also
List of school districts in Mississippi

References

External links
 

Education in Forrest County, Mississippi
School districts in Mississippi
Hattiesburg, Mississippi